Vadnais may refer to:

Carol Vadnais (1945–2014), Canadian ice hockey player
Vadnais Lake, a lake in Minnesota
Vadnais Heights, Minnesota, city in the United States